Arditi is a surname. Notable people with the surname include:

 Lior Arditi (born 1977), Israeli basketball player
 Luigi Arditi (1822–1903), Italian violinist, composer and conductor
 Binyamin Arditi (1897–1981), Austrian/Bulgarian-Israeli politician, author
 Esther Arditi (1937–2003), Israeli soldier, the only woman recipient of the Medal of Distinguished Service
 Giacomo Arditi (1815–1891), Italian historian, economist and writer
 Metin Arditi (born 1945), French-speaking Swiss writer of Turkish Sephardi origin
 Michele Arditi (1746–1838), Italian lawyer, antiquarian and archaeologist
 Moshe Arditi, Turkish-American physician
 Pierre Arditi (born 1944), French actor
 Dani Arditi (born 1951), head of the Israeli National Security Council 2007-2009

Jewish surnames
Italian-language surnames